Sonia Sanoja (2 April 1932 – 26 March 2017) was a Venezuelan dancer, teacher, choreographer, and poet, a pioneer of her country's dance scene in the 1950s and 60s, particularly in the area of contemporary dance.

Career
Sonia Sanoja was born in Caracas on 2 April 1932. This had been founded a few months earlier by Argentine dancers Hery and Luz Thomson and Irish dancers David and Eva Gray, members of the Ballet Russe of Wassily de Basil who had settled in Venezuela after fleeing post-war Europe.

In 1953, Sanoja entered the Grishka Holguín Dance Theater, where Venezuela's contemporary dance movement began. She subsequently went to study in France. Upon returning to Venezuela in 1961, she and Holguín created the Contemporary Dance Foundation. This was a platform for the development of the nation's nascent contemporary dance scene, and its association with the Museo de Bellas Artes of Caracas aided the process of integration with other arts. In 1971, she founded the Sonia Sanoja Choreographic Art Company. She created the project Contemporary Dance of Venezuela that, together with the Theater of Contemporary Dance, under the direction of Grishka Holguín, presented a diversified vision of contemporary dance and gave rise to the emergence of other experimental alternatives. Her students included .

She married poet  in 1960.

Sanoja studied philosophy at the Central University of Venezuela.

In 2015, she was the subject of a tribute from Venezuela's , as well as a short film titled Lección de Danza. In 2016 she returned to the stage with the project Amor amargo by Venezuelan choreographer Leyson Ponce, a work inspired by La hora menguada by Rómulo Gallegos. There she shared the stage with her great friend Graciela Henríquez, a fellow dancer and innovator.

Sonia Sanoja died in Caracas on 26 March 2017 after a long struggle with cancer.

Books
 1963: Duraciones visuales
 1971: A través de la danza
 1981: Tiempo secreto de Sonia Sanoja, with 
 1992: Bajo el signo de la danza,

References

1932 births
2017 deaths
20th-century Venezuelan poets
Contemporary dance choreographers
Dance teachers
Venezuelan female dancers
Venezuelan women poets
Women choreographers
Writers from Caracas